Crescent Heights High School is a high school with an enrollment of 1934 students in grades 10-12 in Calgary, Alberta, Canada. The school is part of the Calgary Board of Education's public school system.

History
In 1915, Crescent Heights High School was called Crescent Heights Collegiate Institute, and was located in what is now Balmoral School. By 1919, enrollment at Crescent Heights High School was 980 students.  The current building was erected in 1928 for a cost of $275,000. It was extensively renovated in 1985-86, with a second full-size gymnasium added, and the original gymnasium converted into a student center. The basement lunch room was converted into a theater and a Building shop was later turned into a Dance room.

The school is a member of the Action for Bright TUTTA Society.

Notable staff
The first principal of Crescent Heights from 1915-1935 was William Aberhart, later Premier of Alberta. 
Another early teacher was Douglas Scott Harkness, who commanded an Anti-Tank Regiment of the Royal Canadian Artillery in the Second World War and served as Minister of National Defence after the war.

Notable alumni
Doris Anderson - Former editor of Chatelaine magazine.
Paul Brandt - Country music artist 
George Chahal - Canadian politician who is the Member of Parliament for Calgary Skyview. He served as the Councillor for Ward 5 on the Calgary City Council from 2017-2021.
Sean Cheesman - International dance choreographer
Tommy Chong - Comedian/Actor
Michael Clarkson – Journalist, Centre for Investigative Journalism Award recipient
Thomas Glenn - GRAMMY Award-winning operatic tenor. 
Eric Greif - Lawyer and entertainment personality
Akeem Haynes - Part of Canada's bronze medal winning Men's 4 × 100 metres relay team in the Rio 2016 Olympic Games 
Violet King Henry - The first black person to graduate law in Alberta and to be admitted to the Alberta Bar, as well as the first black female lawyer in Canada.
Ralph Klein - The 12th Premier of Alberta, started at Crescent Heights, later graduated from Viscount Bennett High School
Rizwan Manji - Portrayed Rajiv on the show Outsourced
Janet Mitchell - artist
Tegan and Sara Quin - Indie rock/New Wave/Indie Pop musicians
George Salt (1903–2003), English entomologist and ecologist, who spent most of his youth in Alberta
Ron Southern - Founder of ATCO Group, Sentgraf Enterprises, Canadian Utilities, Spruce Meadows and AKITA drilling
Ken Taylor - Former Canadian ambassador to Iran, who helped several Americans escape during the Iran hostage crisis.
82 CHHS students are recognized by a memorial and simulated eternal flame in the school foyer as having given their lives in military service in the Second World War.

References

High schools in Calgary
Educational institutions established in 1915
1915 establishments in Alberta